Senangkhanikhom is a district (amphoe) in the northern part of Amnat Charoen province, northeastern Thailand.

Geography
Neighbouring districts are (from the east clockwise): Chanuman, Mueang Amnat Charoen of Amnat Charoen Province and Thai Charoen and Thai Charoen of Yasothon province.

History
The minor district (king amphoe) was created on 15 December 1975, when the five tambons, Senangkhanikhom, Rai Si Suk, Phon Thong, Nong Hai, and Na Wiang were split off from Mueang Amnat Charoen district. It was upgraded to a full district on 1 April 1983. In 1993 it was one of the districts split off from Ubon Ratchathani to form the new province, Amnat Charoen.

Administration
The district is divided into six sub-districts (tambons), which are further subdivided into 58 villages (mubans). Senangkhanikhom is a township (thesaban tambon) which covers parts of tambon Senangkhanikhom. There are further six tambon administrative organizations (TAO).

References

External links
amphoe.com

Senangkhanikhom